Maoridaphne is an extinct genus of sea snails, marine gastropod mollusks in the family Raphitomidae.

Species
Species within the genus Maoridaphne include:
 † Maoridaphne clifdenica (Laws, 1939) 
 † Maoridaphne haroldi Powell, 1942 
 † Maoridaphne kaiparica (Laws, 1939) 
Species brought into synonymy:
 Maoridaphne supracancellata (Schepman, 1913): synonym of Kuroshiodaphne supracancellata (Schepman, 1913)

References

 
Raphitomidae